Jach'a Juqhu (Aymara jach'a big, juqhu muddy place, quagmire,   "big muddy place", also spelled Jachcha Jokho, Jachcha Jokko) is a mountain in the Cordillera Real in the Andes of Bolivia, about  high. It lies in the La Paz Department, Los Andes Province, Batallas Municipality. Jach'a Juqhu is situated south of the mountain Wari Umaña, south-west of Jisk'a Pata, north-west of Wila Lluxi and Warawarani, north of Qala T'uxu and north-east of Jach'a Qullu.

See also
 Chachakumani
 List of mountains in the Andes

References 

Mountains of La Paz Department (Bolivia)